Batrachyla leptopus is a species of frog in the family Batrachylidae.
It is found in Argentina and Chile.
Its natural habitats are subantarctic forest, temperate forest, temperate shrubland, swampland, intermittent freshwater marshes, rural gardens, and open excavations.
It is threatened by habitat loss.

References

Batrachyla
Amphibians of Argentina
Amphibians of Chile
Taxonomy articles created by Polbot
Amphibians described in 1843